General elections were held in Turkey on 21 July 1946, the first multi-party elections in the country's history. The multiple non-transferable vote electoral system was used. The result was a victory for the Republican People's Party, which won 395 of the 465 seats. This election was held on the basis of open voting, secret counting and majority system, with the exception of judicial supervision (open vote, secret classification). Due to these irregularities, it has also been referred to as a "fraudulent election".

Results

References

General elections in Turkey
Turkey
Turkey
General
Election and referendum articles with incomplete results